Pullaiah banzar is a village located in Kalluru Mandal, Khammam district in Telangana. This village has nearly 400 homes and 1500 peoples.

Economy
The common profession is agriculture.  Economical resources are paddy and milk.

References

Villages in Khammam district